Brandon Victor Dixon (born September 23, 1981) is an American actor, singer and theatrical producer. As a musical theatre actor, he is known for Tony Award-nominated Broadway performances as Harpo in the 2005 musical The Color Purple and Eubie Blake in Shuffle Along, or, the Making of the Musical Sensation of 1921 and All That Followed (2016). He originated both roles, as well as the leading role of Berry Gordy Jr. in Motown: The Musical (2013) on Broadway, which earned a nomination for a Grammy Award for Best Musical Theater Album. In 2016, Dixon assumed the role of Aaron Burr in the Broadway company of Hamilton. Off-Broadway as well as in London's West End, Dixon played the role of Hayward Patterson in The Scottsboro Boys and was nominated for a 2014 Laurence Olivier Award for Best Actor in a Leading Role in a Musical.

As a producer, Dixon's credits include Broadway revivals of Hedwig and the Angry Inch and Of Mice and Men (2014); the former won the 2014 Tony Award and the Drama Desk Award for best revival of a musical.

In 2018, Dixon portrayed Judas Iscariot in NBC's live concert version of Andrew Lloyd Webber and Tim Rice's rock opera Jesus Christ Superstar, for which he received a Primetime Emmy nomination for Primetime Emmy Award for Outstanding Actor in a Supporting Role in a Limited or Anthology Series or Movie.

Early life and education 
Dixon was born in Gaithersburg, Maryland on September 23, 1981, and attended the St. Albans School and Columbia University, where he graduated in 2003. He attended the British American Drama Academy at Balliol College, Oxford, England, in mid-1999.

Dixon has noted Ragtime was the "first ever [Broadway] show I saw."

Career

Theater

Early performances 
In 2003, Dixon played Royal in the Encores! production of House of Flowers and adult Simba in the national touring company of The Lion King, a role he landed immediately after graduating from Columbia.

The Color Purple 
In 2005, Dixon created the role of Harpo on Broadway in the musical The Color Purple, for which he was nominated for a Tony Award for Best Featured Actor in a Musical. In The New York Times, theater critic Ben Brantley's review compared Dixon to castmates Felicia P. Fields and Elisabeth Withers-Mendes in the way the latter two "exude a sensual energy that you can feel the audience wants to luxuriate in. (The same impression is cut, in a sunnier vein, by Brandon Victor Dixon[...])".

Dixon subsequently joined the show's touring company. In a 2009 review, The Boston Globe noted the men in the cast were given less to work than the show's women, but said Dixon's performance was nevertheless "lithe and amusing," played to "superb comedic effect."

The Scottsboro Boys 
In 2010, Dixon originated the role of Haywood Patterson, in the Off-Broadway production of the musical The Scottsboro Boys, for which he was nominated for the Drama Desk Award for Outstanding Actor in a Musical. In a review for Variety, David Rooney said, "Haywood Patterson['s] fierce pride and refusal to die for a lie provides an affecting center to the show in Brandon Victor Dixon’s charismatic performance." In the Times, Brantley said, "Brandon Victor Dixon gives the show a shot of soft-pedaled star power. His 11 o’clock number, an angry what-I-stand-for anthem, is especially affecting."

In 2014, Dixon returned to the role of Haywood Patterson in London's West End production of The Scottsboro Boys.

Other shows 
In 2011, Dixon portrayed Tom Collins in the Off-Broadway revival of Rent.

Dixon created the role of Berry Gordy Jr., founder of the Motown record label, in the original Broadway production of Motown: The Musical, which Gordy wrote himself. The show opened at the Lunt-Fontanne Theatre on April 14, 2013. His first leading role on Broadway, critics described it as a "tough, sketchy assignment" in what they felt was a flawed show, but Dixon nevertheless earned a nomination for a Drama League Award for Distinguished Performance.

In 2016, Dixon appeared in the role of Eubie Blake in the musical Shuffle Along, or, the Making of the Musical Sensation of 1921 and All That Followed on Broadway at the Music Box Theatre. He was nominated for the Tony Award for Best Performance by an Actor in a Featured Role in a Musical for his performance.

Hamilton 

Dixon assumed the lead role of Aaron Burr in the Broadway company of Hamilton on August 23, 2016, recruited in part by the role's originator, Leslie Odom, Jr., and selected over the role's three understudies when Dixon became available following the early close of Shuffle Along. Previously Dixon had performed with Hamilton castmate Renée Elise Goldsberry in The Color Purple, as well as other members of the cast, including Christopher Jackson, Ephraim Sykes, and Sasha Hutchings, in workshops and festivals. Dixon played the role of Burr through August 13, 2017.

Reviewing the show in June 2017 for Deadline Hollywood, Jeremy Gerard said that Dixon and other replacements merited comparison with the original cast for the formers' development of distinct but no less compelling interpretations of their characters: "Hamilton’s nemesis, Aaron Burr, is played by the exceptionally fine Brandon Victor Dixon replacing Leslie Odom Jr. The latter was steel cloaked in suavity, while Dixon is more severe in the opening number, which gives us both Hamilton’s back story and the seeds of a rivalry that will only conclude in a duel on the New Jersey shore many decades later. Delivering what is, to my mind, the show’s most astonishing number, 'The Room Where It Happens,' Dixon’s another knockout."

In November 2016, shortly after the U.S. presidential election, Republican Vice President-elect Mike Pence attended Hamilton and Dixon addressed him from the stage following the performance, thanking him for attending and stating: "We, sir—we—are the diverse America who are alarmed and anxious that your new administration will not protect us, our planet, our children, our parents, or defend us and uphold our inalienable rights.  We truly hope that this show has inspired you to uphold our American values and to work on behalf of all of us." This statement was jointly written by the cast, show creator Lin-Manuel Miranda, and producer Jeffrey Seller. Pence stated that he was not offended, but President-elect Donald Trump demanded an apology for the "harassment" of Pence.

Producing 
In 2013, Dixon and Motown the Musical choreographer Warren Adams founded WalkRunFly Productions to support productions for young artists. Through WalkRunFly Productions, he co-produced the 2014 Broadway productions of Of Mice and Men, which was nominated for the Drama Desk Award for Outstanding Revival of a Play, and Hedwig and the Angry Inch, which won the Tony Award for Best Revival of a Musical as well as the Drama Desk Award for Outstanding Revival of a Musical.

As of January 2017, WalkRunFly has two more shows in development: a transfer to Broadway of Whorl Inside a Loop, a play by Dick Scanlan and Sherie Rene Scott set in a prison, and Trial of the Century, a musical about the Lindbergh baby kidnapping.

Television
In addition to his theater work, Dixon began a recurring role on Starz series, Power, in 2017 as attorney Terry Silver. He has been promoted to a series regular as of the fifth season which aired in 2018.

Dixon portrayed Judas Iscariot in the live televised concert production of Jesus Christ Superstar on April 1, 2018, Easter Sunday. Reviewing the show for New York magazine, Matt Zoller Seitz named Dixon as giving one of the “strongest performances” in what Zoller Seitz called "one of the most impressive things I’ve seen in the 20-plus years I’ve been writing about TV." He found Dixon and castmates John Legend, Sara Bareilles, Norm Lewis and Jin Ha “so superb, in terms of their acting as well as their singing, that they diminished other performers who might have been singled out as scene-stealers in lesser productions, such as Alice Cooper’s King Herod.” In The New York Times, Noel Murray gave a similarly rave review, calling the production "a conceptual and artistic triumph" and Dixon its "powerful and charismatic" standout: "Given what 'Jesus Christ Superstar' ultimately says about idols and the people in their shadow, it is appropriate that this production was dominated by Dixon's portrayal of Judas."

Dixon has also appeared on television in The Good Wife and in the 40th Annual Kennedy Center Honors.

In 2019, Dixon appeared in another televised concert production, Fox’s Rent: Live as Tom Collins.

Personal life 
Dixon lives in New York City. In 2019, he delivered the Columbia College Class Day speech.

Accolades 

†: Dixon served as a producer on these productions.

References

External links
 Official website
 
 
 

1981 births
American male musical theatre actors
American theatre managers and producers
Living people
St. Albans School (Washington, D.C.) alumni
Columbia College (New York) alumni
Alumni of Balliol College, Oxford
People from Gaithersburg, Maryland
Actors from Maryland
Broadway theatre producers
African-American male actors
20th-century African-American male singers
21st-century African-American people